Richard Chadwick (1860 – unknown) was an English footballer who played for Stoke.

Career
Chadwick was born in Stoke-upon-Trent and played in the local church league before joining Stoke in 1886. He played once in FA Cup in the 1886–87 season which came in a 10–1 victory over Caernarfon Wanderers. At the end of the season Chadwick re-entered church league football with Longon Albion.

Career statistics

References

English footballers
Stoke City F.C. players
1860 births
Year of death missing
Association football midfielders